Seidenfaden (German for silk thread) may refer to:

Tøger Seidenfaden (1957-2011), Danish journalist 
Gunnar Seidenfaden (1908-2001), Danish diplomat
Erik Seidenfaden (ethnologist) (1881–1958), Danish ethnologist
Erik Seidenfaden (journalist) (1910-1990), Danish journalist
Seidenfaden, a part of the municipality Wipperfürth in North Rhine-Westphalia, Germany